The government of American Samoa consists of a locally elected governor, lieutenant governor and the American Samoa Fono, which consists of an 18-member Senate and a 21-member House of Representatives.  The first popular election for Governor and Lieutenant Governor took place in 1977. Candidates for the offices run together on a joint ticket. The first woman to run for election was Arieta Enesi Mulitauaopele in 1977.

The current lieutenant governor is Eleasalo Ale, who has been in office since 2021.

List of lieutenant governors of American Samoa

Appointed lieutenant governors
 Frank Barnett (Democrat, 1974–76)

Elected lieutenant governors

References

Territorial constitutional officers of American Samoa